Linus Kather (September 22, 1893 – March 10, 1983) was a German politician of the Christian Democratic Union (CDU) and former member of the German Bundestag.

Life 
From 1946 to 1949 Kather was a member of the Hamburg Bürgerschaft. In 1947/48 he was a member of the zone advisory council of the British occupation zone. Kather was a member of the Bundestag from the first federal election in 1949 to 1957.

Literature

References

1893 births
1983 deaths
Members of the Bundestag for Schleswig-Holstein
Members of the Bundestag for North Rhine-Westphalia
Members of the Bundestag 1953–1957
Members of the Bundestag 1949–1953
Members of the Bundestag for the Christian Democratic Union of Germany
Members of the Hamburg Parliament